Phil Hicks (born January 31, 1953) is an American former basketball player from Chicago, Illinois who played for three years at Tulane University, before being drafted by the Houston Rockets in the 1976 NBA draft. He played for the Rockets for only two games, before being traded to the Chicago Bulls. He was traded again at the end of the 1976–77 season to the Denver Nuggets, for whom he played for 20 games.

References
Profile —TheDraftReview.com
Profile —Basketball-Reference.com

1953 births
Living people
American expatriate basketball people in France
American expatriate basketball people in Italy
American men's basketball players
Basketball players from Chicago
Chicago Bulls players
Denver Nuggets players
Houston Rockets draft picks
Houston Rockets players
Pallacanestro Virtus Roma players
Portland Trail Blazers draft picks
Power forwards (basketball)
Reims Champagne Basket players
Tulane Green Wave men's basketball players